Eva Nordung Byström (born 21 April 1957 in Härnösand) is a Church of Sweden bishop of the Diocese of Härnösand. 

Nordung Byström was ordained a priest in 1984. She was the vicar of Arnäs, Gideå and Trehörningsjö between 2004-2014 and of Örnsköldsvik between  2007-2014. She was consecrated and installed as the 26th bishop of Härnösand on December 14, 2014.

References

Living people
1957 births
Swedish Lutheran bishops
21st-century Lutheran bishops
Women Lutheran bishops
Bishops of Härnösand